Josef "Jupp" Kompalla (born 13 March 1936 in Katowice) is a retired German ice hockey referee. He is best known for his officiating of the 1972 Summit Series between the Soviet Union and Canada.

Career
Kompalla began his ice hockey career as a player with Gwardia Katowice in 1951. He won three Polish junior championships with Gwardia Katowice before playing for Gornik Katowice. He emigrated to West Germany in 1958 and joined Preussen Krefeld in German league.  He retired from playing in 1961.

He joined the International Ice Hockey Federation as an official in 1970. In 1972, Kompalla was selected to officiate the 1972 World Ice Hockey Championships matches between Czechoslovakia and the Soviet Union. That same year, he was also selected to officiate the Summit Series between the Soviet Union and Canada. His officiating partner during this series was Franz Baader. Both Kompalla and Baader received criticism from Team Canada during the series, which resulted in Kompalla pairing up with Rudolf Baťa for the final game. During the final game, he called a penalty against Canadian J. P. Parisé which resulted in the player angrily swinging his stick in a threatening gesture at Kompalla. This resulted in a game misconduct for Parise, although Team Canada won the series as a result of improved officiating.

He also officiated in several IIHF World Championships, Canada Cup competitions, and Winter Olympic Games. He was inducted into the IIHF Hall of Fame in 2003. That same year, Kompalla resigned as the referee representative in the German Ice Hockey League but stayed with the organization as an official match watcher.

References

External links
IIHF Hall of Fame

1936 births
1972 Summit Series
Living people
Sportspeople from Katowice
People from Silesian Voivodeship (1920–1939)
Polish ice hockey players
Polish emigrants to Germany
German ice hockey players
German ice hockey officials
IIHF Hall of Fame inductees
Recipients of the Cross of the Order of Merit of the Federal Republic of Germany